Johnny Ball (born Graham Thalben Ball; 23 May 1938) is an English television personality, a populariser of mathematics and the father of BBC Radio 2 DJ Zoe Ball.

Early life
Ball was born in Bristol and attended Kingswood Primary School on the eastern edge of the city. Later in his childhood the family moved to Bolton, Lancashire, where he attended Bolton County Grammar School. He left formal education with two "O" Levels, one in mathematics and one in geography. He was called up for national service and spent three years in the Royal Air Force. He was posted to Wales as a radar operator and was later sent to Germany to monitor the Hamburg-Berlin air corridor. 

Ball began his entertainment career by working as a Butlin's Redcoat, and was an entertainer in northern clubs and cabaret. He was nicknamed Johnny after John Ball, who played for Bolton Wanderers from 1950 to 1958 and the name stuck.

Television and radio career
Ball was a regular fixture on children's television from the mid 1970s and throughout the 1980s, presenting several series of science and technology programmes intended for children (including Think of a Number; Think Again; Think Backwards; Think...This Way and Johnny Ball Reveals All). He was also one of the hosts of pre-school programme Play School beginning in 1967 and continuing throughout the 1970s and beyond. As well as appearing on screen Ball wrote jokes for some shows including Crackerjack. All of these shows (except the ITV programme ...Reveals All) appeared on the BBC. Ball's shows were known for presenting scientific and technological principles in an entertaining and accessible way for young people.

In 2003, he appeared on The Terry and Gaby Show in which he answered viewers' questions. In July 2004, he was named in the Radio Times list of the top 40 most eccentric TV presenters of all time. In July 2012, he presented a Horizon special on ageing on BBC Four. He has starred in ITV and Channel 4 television adverts as well as radio adverts for the Yorkshire-based firm Help-Link.

In 2012, Ball took part in the Strictly Come Dancing TV show, where he was paired with Aliona Vilani. A training accident in the three-week interval resulted in torn ligaments for Vilani, causing her to retire temporarily from the show. She was replaced by Iveta Lukošiūtė who, with Ball, was eliminated in the first week. Vilani returned in the final group dance alongside Ball. In a TV interview in October 2017, Ball claimed Vilani faked the injury, with Vilani denying the allegation and saying she would take legal advice over Ball's comments. There are no reports that she subsequently took any form of legal action. He was 74 at the time of Strictly, and he is the oldest contestant in the show's history.

Personal life
Ball's daughter Zoe by his first wife, Julia née Anderson, previously presented Strictly Come Dancing: It Takes Two for BBC TV and currently presents the breakfast show on BBC Radio 2. The couple divorced when Zoe was two. 

Ball lives with his current wife Diane in Bolton.

Series guide
Think of a Number
Pilot: 2 April 1977
Series 1: 6 editions – 12 April 1978 – 17 May 1978
Series 2: 6 editions – 12 September 1979 – 17 October 1979
Series 3: 6 editions – 10 September 1980 – 15 October 1980
Series 4: 6 editions – 15 September 1982 – 20 October 1982
Series 5: 6 editions – 4 January 1984 – 8 February 1984
Series 6: 6 editions – 26 September 1984 – 31 October 1984

Think Again
Series 1: 5 editions – 9 January 1981 – 6 February 1981
Series 2: 6 editions – 8 January 1982 – 12 February 1982
Series 3: 6 editions – 7 January 1983 – 11 February 1983
Series 4: 6 editions – 13 September 1983 – 18 October 1983
Series 5: 6 editions – 10 September 1985 – 15 October 1985

Think!Backwards
Five editions shown over one week – 28 September 1981 – 2 October 1981

Think! This Way
Five editions shown over one week – 28 March 1983 – 1 April 1983

Think It ... Do It
Series 1: 6 editions – 11 March 1986 – 15 April 1986
Series 2: 6 editions – 27 February 1987 – 3 April 1987

Knowhow
Series 1: 6 editions – 8 March 1988 – 12 April 1988
Series 2: 6 editions – 25 October 1988 – 29 November 1988
Series 3: 6 editions – 2 January 1990 – 6 February 1990 (does not feature in series 3)

Johnny Ball Reveals All
Series 1: 7 editions – 14 June 1989 – 26 July 1989
Series 2: 6 editions – 3 August 1990 – 7 September 1990
Series 3: 7 editions – 18 March 1992 – 29 April 1992
Series 4: 7 editions – 5 July 1993 – 16 August 1993
Series 5: 5 editions – 8 August 1994 – 1 September 1994

(source: BBC)

Other activities
Ball rejects the overwhelming scientific consensus on climate change, claiming that "carbon dioxide has been unfairly victimised in the debate." He supports the expansion of nuclear power and has given speeches arguing for its development. On 15 December 2009, Ball was booed off stage by atheists at a London show for his climate change denial.
In November 2006, Ball voiced his opposition to the Safeguarding Vulnerable Groups Act, which would require any adult working with children to be vetted by the Criminal Records Bureau. In an interview with The Sunday Times, he said: "It is like George Orwell's 1984... a quarter of adults will have to be checked... The fear we are instilling in [children] is abhorrent."
Ball served as Rector of the University of Glasgow from 1993–1996.
Ball is a supporter of the FatallyFlawed campaign against the use of plug-in socket covers.
 In April 2014, Ball donated his time and talent as voice-over in an educational animated video for the Raspberry Pi Foundation, a Cambridge-based UK charity whose aim is to get children interested in taking up a career in computer programming.
On 30 November 2019, Ball appeared as a surprise guest with Robert Rinder in the Midnight Gameshow section of Michael McIntyre's Big Show.
From 2020-2021 Ball appeared five times as a speaker on Numberphile, a YouTube channel hosted by Brady Haran. In his episodes he spoke about "Russian multiplication", "The Mesolabe Compass and Square Roots", "Parabolas and Archimedes", "The Volume of a Sphere", and "Area of the Q".

Bibliography

 (American edition of "Think of a Number")

 (different from the 2005 book of the same name)

References

External links

Johnny Ball Productions — Official website
Johnny Ball biography and credits at BFI Screenonline
Think of a number... think Johnny Ball
Johnny Ball "slates" children's TV
Think of a Number – TV Cream entry
BBC – Strictly Come Dancing
FatallyFlawed – Johnny Ball supports campaign

1938 births
Living people
20th-century Royal Air Force personnel
BBC television presenters
Butlins Redcoats
English television presenters
People from Bolton
Television personalities from Bristol
Rectors of the University of Glasgow
Science communicators
Television personalities from Greater Manchester